Knyghthode and Bataile is a fifteenth-century verse paraphrase by John Neele of Vegetius Renatus' treatise De Re Militari. Influenced by the years of English occupation of France, and completed circa November 1459 to June 1460, it has been called 'one of the most brilliant military poems of the fifteenth century.' It was published in a modern edition by the Early English Text Society in 1935, and most recently by Boydell and Brewer in 2012.

References

Medieval literature